Femina Potens (Latin: Powerful Woman) was a non-profit art gallery and performance art space active from 2001 to 2016, and located in San Francisco, California. It was founded in 2001 by artistic director Madison Young, which sought to bring greater visibility and advancement to female artists, including queer and transgender ones. The gallery highlighted feminist pornography, as well as sex work.

Notable artists that showed work at Femina Potens included Fakir Musafar, and Nancy Mizuno Elliott.

As of 2016, Femina Potens closed its gallery at the Market Street location in San Francisco; and the official website and social media pages are no longer active.

See also 
 Annie Sprinkle
 Midori

References

Contemporary art galleries in the United States
2001 establishments in California
Mission District, San Francisco
Art galleries established in 2001
LGBT arts organizations
Feminist art organizations in the United States
2016 disestablishments in California
Art galleries disestablished in 2016
Art museums and galleries in San Francisco